Keith Humphreys (born 1966 in West Virginia) is an American psychologist currently the Esther Ting Memorial Professor at Stanford University, a Senior Research Career Scientist in the Veterans Health Administration, and an Honorary Professor at the Institute of Psychiatry, King's College, London. 

He is known for his scholarship on addiction. He is The Deputy Editor in Chief for the journal Addiction. Humphreys won the 2021 Under Secretary's Award for Outstanding Achievement in Health Services Research from the U.S. Department of Veterans Affairs.

Education
He obtained his B.A. from Michigan State University and his A.M. from University of Illinois from 1991 followed by his Ph.D. there in 1993.

Research on Self-Help Groups for Substance Use Disorders

In his widely-cited book, Circles of Recovery, Humphreys synthesized extensive evidence that a broad range of mutual help groups benefit individuals with substance use disorders.  This included traditional 12-step mutual help organizations like Narcotics Anonymous, non-12 step groups like Women for Sobriety, and non-abstinence oriented groups such as Moderation Management.  He was a member of the team that in 2020 released the Cochrane Systematic Review of Alcoholics Anonymous Research, which attracted widespread media attention as the strongest evidence to date of the benefits of Alcoholics Anonymous participation.  For his research on self-help groups and treatments for substance use disorders, Humphreys won the 2021 VA Undersecretary of Health's Award for Outstanding Achievement in Health Services Research.

Public Policy Advising Regarding Addiction

Humphreys served as a Member of the White House Commission on Drug-Free Communities under President George W. Bush. He also served as Senior Policy Advisor at the White House Office of National Drug Control Policy (ONDCP) during the passage of the Affordable Care Act, which included full coverage for the treatment of addiction.  Since leaving The White House, he has continued to be involved in federal policy deliberations, including being a senior editor of U.S. Surgeon General Vivek Murthy’s report Facing Addiction in America, testifying to the House Committee on Government Reform about the mission and structure of ONDCP, testifying to the House Subcommittee on Crime, Immigration, and Border Security about the lack of evidence that sanctuary cites contribute to the opioid epidemic, and advising Congress on the 2018 Support for Patients and Communities Act.

In many television and newspaper interviews, Humphreys has been highly critical of the role of Purdue Pharma and other opioid manufacturers in starting the opioid epidemic. He has also been critical of the Trump Administration's response to the epidemic, which he told CBS News was a “complete failure”.

Humphreys worked with California Lt. Governor Gavin Newsom on the Blue Ribbon Commission on Marijuana Law and Policy, which recommended that public health and youth protection be higher priorities than corporate profit if California legalized marijuana.  He also served on the team led by drug policy expert Mark Kleiman that advised the State of Washington how to effectively regulate the marijuana industry after that state legalized.  Both Kleiman and Humphreys rejected as a false dichotomy the choice between criminal punishment of marijuana users and an unregulated profit seeking corporate sector creating a clone of the tobacco industry.  In an interview with Bill Keller of The Marshall Project, Kleiman and Humphreys also agreed that newly legalized marijuana products are highly potent and probably have different effects than marijuana of prior eras. Humphreys has also been critical of the medical marijuana industry for encouraging opioid addicted individuals to replace their FDA approved medications with marijuana and for making false claims about the ability of marijuana to cure cancer, Alzheimer's Disease, and other serious illnesses.

Humphreys has also been extensively involved in British drug and alcohol policy.  This has included advising the London Greater Authority on the establishment of mandatory sobriety programs for alcohol-involved offenders, serving on Professor Dame Carol Black’s independent review of British drug policy, and being a member of Baroness Ilora Finlay‘s Commission on Alcohol Harm. In 2022, Queen Elizabeth II made Humphreys an Honorary Officer of the British Empire to recognize his service to addiction science and policy in Britain.

Humphreys founded and currently co-directs the Stanford Network on Addiction Policy, which brings addiction researchers and policymakers to create better policies toward addiction.  Current members include Fmr. State Senator Dan Foster, California Supreme Court Justice Mariano-Florentino Cuellar, California Assembly Minority Leader Marie Waldron, and Huntington, West Virginia Mayor Steve Williams.

Humphreys frequently writes for a general audience about addiction, mental health, criminal justice, and drug policy. Since 2014, he has been a regular contributor at Washington Post. He has also published articles in The New York Times, Wall Street Journal, The Huffington Post, and The Guardian.

Selected recent publications
 Humphreys, K. (2018). How Medicaid can strengthen the national response to the opioid epidemic.  American Journal of Public Health, 108, 589–590.
Humphreys, K., Felbab-Brown, V., & Caulkins, J. (2018).  Opioids of the masses: Stopping an American epidemic from going global.  Foreign Affairs, May/June, 118–129.
Lembke, A., Papac, J., & Humphreys, K. (2018).  Our other prescription drug problem.  New England Journal of Medicine, 378, 693–695.
Humphreys, K. (2017). Avoiding globalisation of the prescription opioid epidemic.  Lancet, 390, 437–439.
Humphreys, K., Malenka, R., Knutson, B., & MacCoun, R. (2017).  Brains, environments and policy responses to addiction.  Science, 356, 1237–1238.
Friedmann, P.D., Andrews, C.M., & Humphreys, K. (2017).  How repealing the Affordable Care Act would worsen the opioid epidemic.  New England Journal of Medicine, 376. DOI: 10.1056/NEJMp1700834

References

Stanford University faculty
21st-century American psychologists
Living people
1966 births
Honorary Officers of the Order of the British Empire
20th-century American psychologists